The Journal of Biological Dynamics is a peer-reviewed open access scientific journal covering mathematical modeling in the field of biology. It was established in 2007 and is published continuously by Taylor & Francis. The editors-in-chief are  J. M. Cushing (University of Arizona) and Saber N. Elaydi (Trinity University). According to the Journal Citation Reports, the journal has a 2018 impact factor of 1.642.

References

External links

Publications established in 2007
English-language journals
Continuous journals
Taylor & Francis academic journals
Open access journals
Mathematical and theoretical biology
Biology journals